Ad van de Wiel (born 1 August 1959) is a Dutch former professional footballer who played as a forward for Willem II, Belgian club KFC Turnhout, RKC, Den Bosch and FC Volendam. He was the top scorer in the 1987–88 Eerste Divisie season, with 34 goals. Outside of football, van de Wiel was known for his love of gambling and women, and he received a three-month prison sentence after stabbing a love rival. A biography about him was published in 2015.

References

External links
 

1959 births
Living people
Sportspeople from 's-Hertogenbosch
Footballers from North Brabant
Dutch footballers
Association football forwards
Eredivisie players
Eerste Divisie players
Willem II (football club) players
KFC Turnhout players
RKC Waalwijk players
FC Den Bosch players
FC Volendam players
Dutch expatriate footballers
Dutch expatriate sportspeople in Belgium
Expatriate footballers in Belgium